The Medal of Honor Bowl was an American college football all-star game played in Charleston, South Carolina, in January 2014 and 2015. The bowl was not sanctioned by the National Collegiate Athletic Association (NCAA). Primary beneficiaries of the game were the Medal of Honor Museum on the aircraft carrier  and, initially, the Wounded Warrior Project.

Background
In 2004, Tommy McQueeney, a former Citadel Board of Visitors member, led an ownership group interested in starting a Charleston-based college bowl game, the "Palmetto Bowl", but was blocked by an NCAA ban on playing postseason games at pre-determined locations in South Carolina due to the Confederate battle flag being flown at a civil war monument on the State House grounds.

History
The Charleston-based bowl attempt was revived as a proposed "Legends Bowl" to begin in 2014 at The Citadel's Johnson Hagood Stadium featuring teams from the Sun Belt and Mid-American conferences, with NBCSN as its broadcasting partner.

The Medal of Honor Bowl was announced by organizers in October 2013, as a college football all-star game in place of the proposed Legends Bowl. The game would not require the NCAA bowl committee's approval, by inviting players who have exhausted their college eligibility. The first game was scheduled for January 11, 2014, at Johnson Hagood Stadium with the expectation of drawing players from SEC and ACC conferences. Organizers reached a five-year agreement with The Citadel for use of its stadium.

The American and National teams for 2014 were chosen from a pool of 300 players by the bowl's executive director, who looked for players with profiles expected to fill NFL draft needs in the fourth to seventh rounds. Pro Player Insiders ranked college football all-star games in September 2014, placing this game fourth. At that time, 64 players from the bowl had been drafted, signed, or had a tryout with an NFL team; there were 7 players on active rosters, 16 players on practice squads, and 2 players on injured reserve. In October 2014, the bowl announced that NBCSN would broadcast the next game on January 10, 2015, starting at 2:30 PM.

Another South Carolina-based game, the College All-Star Bowl, had started in 2013, and was played twice in Greenville. With the similarity in purpose of the College All-Star Bowl and the Medal of Honor Bowl, in July 2014 it was announced that the College All-Star Bowl would cease operations, and that game's founder would join the Medal of Honor Bowl as director of player development. Later that month, Sam Wyche, a College All-Star Bowl board member, was announced as a member of the Medal of Honor Bowl's national board of directors.

On August 27, 2015, after the NCAA lifted its ban on playing postseason games at pre-determined locations in South Carolina (following the State House's July 2015 removal of the Confederate battle flag), bowl organizers announced their intent to apply for NCAA sanctioning as a traditional postseason bowl game featuring FBS college teams, with a tentative game date of December 18, 2016. However, in April 2016, the NCAA announced a moratorium on new bowl games.

Medal of Honor Bowl organizers tentatively set a date of January 7, 2017, for playing the game under its prior all-star format. In September 2016, organizers announced that the bowl would be suspended, due to Johnson Hagood Stadium having "myriad issues related to structural integrity and lead paint mitigation." The announcement included cancellation of the game tentatively planned for January 7, 2017, and a new tentative date of January 13, 2018. As of May 2017, significant renovation work was underway at Johnson Hagood Stadium. As of early January 2018, there have been no press releases or recent updates to the official website;  the bowl appears to be on indefinite hold.

Game results

2014: American 20, National 3

2015: National 26, American 14

MVPs

References

External links

Medal of Honor Bowl video via Vimeo

College football bowls
College football all-star games
Sports in Charleston, South Carolina
2014 establishments in South Carolina
Sports competitions in South Carolina
Events in Charleston, South Carolina